Henri De Pauw (born 26 February 1911, date of death unknown) was a Belgian water polo player who competed in the 1928 Summer Olympics, in the 1936 Summer Olympics, and in the 1948 Summer Olympics.

In 1928 he was a member of the Belgian team in the 1928 tournament. He played one match and scored three goals.

Eight years later he won the bronze medal with the Belgian team. He played three matches.

In 1948 he was part of the Belgian team which finished fourth in the Olympic tournament.

See also
 List of Olympic medalists in water polo (men)

External links
 

1911 births
Year of death missing
Belgian male water polo players
Olympic water polo players of Belgium
Water polo players at the 1928 Summer Olympics
Water polo players at the 1936 Summer Olympics
Water polo players at the 1948 Summer Olympics
Olympic bronze medalists for Belgium
Olympic medalists in water polo
Medalists at the 1936 Summer Olympics
Sportspeople from Antwerp
20th-century Belgian people